Spear Spur is a rock spur 3 nautical miles (6 km) east of Clinton Spur and 2 nautical miles (3.7 km) west of Kelley Spur, on the south side of Dufek Massif, Pensacola Mountains. Mapped by United States Geological Survey (USGS) from surveys and U.S. Navy air photos, 1956–66. Named by Advisory Committee on Antarctic Names (US-ACAN) for Albert Spear, builder, Ellsworth Station winter party, 1957.

 
Ridges of Queen Elizabeth Land